A pantriagonal magic cube is a magic cube where all 4m2 pantriagonals sum correctly. There are 4 one-segment pantriagonals, 12(m − 1) two-segment pantriagonals, and 4(m − 2)(m − 1) three-segment pantriagonals. This class of magic cubes may contain some simple magic squares and/or pandiagonal magic squares, but not enough to satisfy any other classifications. 

The magic constant for magic cubes is S = m(m3 + 1)/2.

A proper pantriagonal magic cube has 7m2 lines summing correctly. It contains no magic squares.

The smallest pantriagonal magic cube has order 4. 
A pantriagonal magic cube is the 3-dimensional equivalent of the pandiagonal magic square – instead of the ability to move a line from one edge to the opposite edge of the square with it remaining magic, you can move a plane from one edge to the other.

See also
 Magic cube classes
 triagonal

References
 Heinz, H.D. and Hendricks, J. R., Magic Square Lexicon: Illustrated. Self-published, 2000, 0-9687985-0-0.
 Hendricks, John R., The Pan-4-agonal Magic Tesseract, The American Mathematical Monthly, Vol. 75, No. 4, April 1968, p. 384.
 Hendricks, John R., The Pan-3-agonal Magic Cube, Journal of Recreational Mathematics, 5:1, 1972, pp51-52.
 Hendricks, John R., The Pan-3-agonal Magic Cube of Order-5, JRM, 5:3, 1972, pp 205-206.
 Hendricks, John R., Pan-n-agonals in Hypercubes, JRM, 7:2, 1974, pp 95-96.
 Hendricks, John R., The Pan-3-agonal Magic Cube of Order-4, JRM, 13:4, 1980-81, pp 274-281.
 Hendricks, John R., Creating Pan-3-agonal Magic Cubes of Odd Order, JRM, 19:4, 1987, pp 280-285.
 Hendricks, J.R., Inlaid Magic Squares and Cubes 2nd Edition, 2000, 0-9684700-3-3.
 Clifford A. Pickover (2002). The Zen of Magic Squares, Circles and Stars. Princeton Univ. Press. 0-691-07041-5 page 178.

External links
http://www.magichypercubes.com/Encyclopedia/ Aale de Winkel: Magic Encyclopedia
http://members.shaw.ca/hdhcubes/cube_perfect.htm  Harvey Heinz: Perfect Magic Hypercubes

Magic squares